Harvey John Harman (November 5, 1900 – December 17, 1969) was an American college football player and coach. He served as the head coach at Haverford College (1922–1929), Sewanee: The University of the South (1930), the University of Pennsylvania (1931–1937), and Rutgers University (1938–1941, 1946–1955), compiling a career college football record of 140–107–7. Harman was posthumously inducted into the College Football Hall of Fame as a coach in 1981.

Harman played college football at the University of Pittsburgh. From 1931 to 1937, he coached at Penn, where he compiled a 31–23–2 record. Between 1938 and 1955, he coached at Rutgers, where he compiled a 74–44–2 record. He served in the Navy during World War II.

Head coaching record

See also
 List of college football head coaches with non-consecutive tenure

References

External links
 
 

1900 births
1969 deaths
American football tackles
Haverford Fords football coaches
Rutgers Scarlet Knights football coaches
Penn Quakers football coaches
Pittsburgh Panthers football players
Sewanee Tigers football coaches
College Football Hall of Fame inductees
United States Navy personnel of World War II
People from Selinsgrove, Pennsylvania
Coaches of American football from Pennsylvania
Players of American football from Pennsylvania